Beygom Qaleh Rural District is in the Central District of Naqadeh County, West Azerbaijan province, Iran. At the National Census of 2006, its population was 14,830 in 2,977 households. There were 15,992 inhabitants in 4,060 households at the following census of 2011. At the most recent census of 2016, the population of the rural district was 15,744 in 4,291 households. The largest of its 34 villages was Beygom Qaleh, with 1,727 people.

References 

Naqadeh County

Rural Districts of West Azerbaijan Province

Populated places in West Azerbaijan Province

Populated places in Naqadeh County